Bryony Jean Coles,  (born 12 August 1946) is a prehistoric archaeologist and academic. She is best known for her work studying Doggerland, an area of land now submerged beneath the North Sea.

Early life and education
Coles was born on 12 August 1946 to John Samuel Orme   and Jean Esther Orme (née Harris). She studied at Bristol University before completing her postgraduate degree at the London Institute of Archaeology and completing an MPhil in Anthropology at University College London.

Academic career
Coles became a lecturer in prehistoric archaeology at the University of Exeter in 1972. She was promoted to Professor of Prehistoric Archaeology in 1996: when she retired in 2008 she was appointed professor emeritus. Her work studying Doggerland began in the 1990s. Coles named Doggerland after Dogger Bank, a large sandbank in the southern North Sea. In 1998, Coles produced hypothetical maps of the area.

As well as research into Doggerland, Coles has also done extensive research into wetland archaeology, particularly in the Somerset Levels alongside her husband, John Coles. Their work with the Somerset Levels Project resulted in the establishment of a new branch of archaeology focusing on wetlands and in 1998, they received the Imperial Chemical Industries (ICI) Award for the best archaeological project offering a major contribution to knowledge. Coles began also studying the European beaver after realising that a series of distinctive marks on preserved wood found in the Somerset Levels were made by beavers and not humans as first assumed. She mapped out the activities of beavers in Brittany for around 5 years so that she could learn how to see signs of beavers in the environment and to help differentiate between beaver and human activity in any future archaeological sites.

Personal life
Coles was married to John Coles from 1985 until his death in 2020. They established The John and Bryony Coles Bursary in 1998. The bursary was created to help students who are travelling outside of their own country to study or work in prehistoric archaeology.

Honours
On 27 November 1975, Coles was elected a Fellow of the Society of Antiquaries of London (FSA). In 2007, she was elected a Fellow of the British Academy (FBA), the United Kingdom's national academy for the humanities and social sciences.

External links
 Bryony Coles on the Archaeology Data Service
 Bryony Coles on WorldCat Identities

References

British women archaeologists
British archaeologists
Prehistorians
Living people
Alumni of the University of Bristol
Alumni of the UCL Institute of Archaeology
1946 births
Fellows of the Society of Antiquaries of London
Fellows of the British Academy